Twin Lakes is an unincorporated place in northern Alberta under the jurisdiction of the County of Northern Lights.  

County of Northern Lights